McGillicuddy ( or ) is a surname of Irish origin, meaning "son of the servant of St. Mochuda". A variant form of the name is Mac Giolla Mhochuda. Other Anglicised forms of Mac Giolla Chuda include MacGillacuddy, MacGillecuddy, MacGillycuddy, MacIllicuddy, MacElcuddy, MacElhuddy and Mac Giolla Coda

The MacGillycuddy clan were a sept of the O'Sullivans. The family did not adopt this surname until the sixteenth century.

Notable people with the surname include:

 Richard Archdekin (1616–1690), who used the alias McGillicuddy
 Connie Mack (Cornelius McGillicuddy, Sr., 1862–1956), American professional baseball player, manager, and team owner
 Connie Mack III (Cornelius Alexander McGillicuddy III, born 1940), former Republican politician
 Connie Mack IV (Cornelius Harvey McGillicuddy IV, born 1967), U.S. Representative for Florida's 14th congressional district
 Daniel J. McGillicuddy (1859–1936), United States Representative from Maine
 John McGillicuddy (1930–2009), American banking industry executive
 Valentine McGillycuddy (1849–1939), surgeon from Detroit and Indian agent in Nebraska

Fictional characters:
 Dr. Aloysius McGillicuddy, putative inventor of Fireball Cinnamon Whisky
 Lucy McGillicuddy Ricardo, fictional character from the American television series I Love Lucy
 Mrs Elspeth McGillicuddy, main character in the Agatha Christie crime novel 4.50 from Paddington 
 Mrs McGillicuddy, citizen of the town of Popperville in the children's book Mike Mulligan and His Steam Shovel by Virginia Lee Burton
 Mez McGillicuddy is the name of a party guest who plays the French horn, played by the composer David Amram, in the 1959 short film Pull My Daisy.

See also
 McGillicuddy Highland Army, the fighting wing of New Zealand's Clan McGillicuddy
 McGillycuddy of the Reeks, one of the hereditary Chiefs of the name of Ireland
 McGillicuddy Serious Party, satirical political party in New Zealand politics
 McGillicutty (disambiguation), a similar surname

References

Surnames of Irish origin
Patronymic surnames
Anglicised Irish-language surnames